Østerdølen (the Østerdal Resident) is a local Norwegian newspaper published in Stor-Elvdal in Hedmark county. 

The newspaper was established in August 1999 and is published once a week in Koppang. It covers events in the municipalities of Stor-Elvdal, Engerdal, Rendalen, and Åmot. The editor of the paper is Njaal Kværnes. Østerdølen received an award for having the best front page in 2001 in the competition Årets Forside (Front Page of the Year).

Circulation
According to the Norwegian Audit Bureau of Circulations and National Association of Local Newspapers, Øksnesavisa has had the following annual circulation:
 2003: 1,446
 2004: 1,407
 2005: 1,243
 2006: 1,210
 2007: 1,201
 2008: 1,016
 2009: 1,010
 2010: 1,006
 2011: 894
 2012: 915
 2013: 826
 2014: 787
 2015: 710
 2016: 806

References

Newspapers published in Norway
Norwegian-language newspapers
Stor-Elvdal
Mass media in Hedmark
Publications established in 1999
1999 establishments in Norway